Si Songkhram is a district (amphoe) in Nakhon Phanom province in northeast Thailand.

Geography
Neighboring districts are (from the north clockwise): Na Thom, Ban Phaeng, Tha Uthen, Phon Sawan, and Na Wa of Nakhon Phanom Province, and Akat Amnuai of Sakon Nakhon province.

The district is named after its main river, the Songkhram River.

History
The area was at first part of Tha Uthen district. On 1 April 1926, it was split off as the minor district (king amphoe) Akat Amnui (อากาศอำนวย), the present day Akat Amnui District in neighboring Sakon Nakhon was also originally controlled from Tha Uthen. The minor district consisted of the seven tambons: Na Wa, Ban Kha, Ban Siao, Sam Phong, Ban Waeng, Na Thom, and Ban Phaeng. The minor district was renamed Si Songkhram in 1939, and was upgraded to a full district on 10 March 1953.

Administration 
The district is divided into nine sub-districts (tambons), which are further subdivided into 106 villages (mubans). Si Songkhram itself has township (thesaban tambon) status and covers part of tambon Si Songkhram. There are a further nine tambon tambon administrative organization (TAO).

References

External links
amphoe.com

Si Songkhram